Garifullin is a masculine surname, its feminine counterpart is Garifullina. It may refer to

Aida Garifullina (born 1987), Russian operatic soprano
Artyom Garifullin (born 1990), Russian ice hockey player
Ildar Garifullin (born 1963), Russian Nordic combined skier